Ukraina is a rural locality (a station) in Tomsky Selsoviet of Seryshevsky District, Amur Oblast, Russia. The population was 74 as of 2018. There are 2 streets.

Geography 
Ukraina is located 19 km south of Seryshevo (the district's administrative centre) by road. Krasnaya Polyana is the nearest rural locality.

References 

Rural localities in Seryshevsky District